Steven Darcel McBath (born October 28, 1985) is an American football coach and former safety who is currently the cornerbacks coach at Mississippi State University. He was drafted by the Denver Broncos in the second round of the 2009 NFL Draft. He played college football at Texas Tech. McBath has also played for the Jacksonville Jaguars and San Francisco 49ers.

Early years
McBath was born in Gainesville, Texas. As a defensive back and wide receiver in high school, he led the Gainesville Leopards to a 2003 3A state football championship, a 35–24 win over a Burnet High School team, led by former third string Dallas Cowboys quarterback Stephen McGee and former Tampa Bay Buccaneers wide receiver Jordan Shipley.

Professional career

Denver Broncos
The Broncos selected McBath in the 2nd round (48th overall) of the 2009 NFL Draft.  On July 26, 2009, McBath signed a four-year, $3.85 million contract with $2.01 million guaranteed.  His base salary will be $310,000 in 2009, $395,000 in 2010, $480,000 in 2011, and $565,000 in 2012.

McBath played in 13 games during his rookie year, accumulating 26 tackles (22 solo and 4 assisted). During Week 2 against the Cleveland Browns, McBath intercepted quarterback Brady Quinn for his first career interception. McBath's next interception would not be until Week 14 against the Indianapolis Colts quarterback at the time, Peyton Manning. McBath would suffer a broken forearm only a few plays later, eventually placing him on the injured reserve list for the rest of the season. On September 4, 2011, McBath was waived by Denver.

Jacksonville Jaguars
McBath was signed by the Jacksonville Jaguars on December 12, 2011 and later released on April 23, 2012.

San Francisco 49ers
McBath was signed by the San Francisco 49ers on July 23, 2012 to a one-year deal.

In the 2012 season, McBath and the 49ers appeared in Super Bowl XLVII. In the game, he recorded one tackle as the 49ers fell to the Baltimore Ravens by a score of 34–31.

McBath re-signed with the 49ers to another one-year contract. On August 22, 2013, the 49ers placed McBath on injured reserve due to a foot injury he suffered in the second preseason game against the Kansas City Chiefs.

NFL statistics

Key
 GP: games played
 COMB: combined tackles
 TOTAL: total tackles
 AST: assisted tackles
 SACK: sacks
 FF: forced fumbles
 FR: fumble recoveries
 FR YDS: fumble return yards 
 INT: interceptions
 IR YDS: interception return yards
 AVG IR: average interception return
 LNG: longest interception return
 TD: interceptions returned for touchdown
 PD: passes defensed

Awards and honors
2007 Honorable Mention All-Big 12
2008 First-team All-Big 12

Coaching career
In 2016, McBath was a defensive quality control intern for the North Texas Mean Green, primarily working with defensive backs. The following year, he joined Washington State's coaching staff, led by former Texas Tech head coach Mike Leach, as a defensive quality control assistant. He was elevated to cornerbacks coach in 2018, and served as interim defensive coordinator in 2019 after Tracy Claeys' resignation.

References

External links
 Mississippi State bio
 San Francisco 49ers bio
 Texas Tech bio
 Washington State bio

1985 births
Living people
People from Greenville, Texas
Players of American football from Texas
American football safeties
Texas Tech Red Raiders football players
Denver Broncos players
Jacksonville Jaguars players
San Francisco 49ers players
North Texas Mean Green football coaches
Washington State Cougars football coaches